Aylmer is a surname. Notable people with the surname include:

 Edward Aylmer, Welsh MP
 Edward Aylmer (cricketer), first-class cricketer and Royal Navy officer
 Felix Aylmer, English stage actor
 Sir Fenton Aylmer, 13th Baronet, British Army general and Victoria Cross recipient
 Frederick Whitworth Aylmer, 6th Baron Aylmer Royal Navy officer who penetrated the Gironde estuary in 1815
 George Aylmer, Irish officer of the Royal Navy who was killed at the Battle of Bantry Bay in 1689
 Jennifer Aylmer, American operatic soprano
 John Aylmer (bishop)
 John Aylmer (classicist), Greek and Latin poet
 Matthew Aylmer, 1st Baron Aylmer
 Matthew Whitworth-Aylmer, 5th Baron Aylmer

As a forename, it may refer to:

 Aylmer Buesst, Australian conductor
 Aylmer Firebrace (1886–1972), British Royal Navy officer and fire chief
 Aylmer and Louise Maude, English translators
 Aylmer Vallance, Scottish newspaper editor

As a middle name, it may refer to:
 Udolphus Aylmer Coates, British town planner

See also
 Aylmer baronets
 Baron Aylmer
 Aylmer, a character in Brain Damage
 A character in the short story "The Birth-Mark"
Elmer (disambiguation)
Ronald Aylmer Fisher, British Statistician
Lake Aylmer, Quebec, Canada
Aylmer Lake, Northwest Territories, Canada